Henri Bierna (2 September 1905 – 28 August 1944) was a Belgian footballer. A forward, he played in nine matches for the Belgium national team in 1927 and 1928 and was part of the squad at the 1928 Summer Olympics. He was killed during an American bombing raid in 1944 during the Second World War.

References

External links
 

1905 births
1944 deaths
Footballers from Liège
Belgian footballers
Association football forwards
Belgium international footballers
Footballers at the 1928 Summer Olympics
Olympic footballers of Belgium
Belgian civilians killed in World War II
Deaths by airstrike during World War II
Deaths by American airstrikes